Isa sa mga mahalagang kontribusyon ng isang magaling na Pilipinong manunulat na si
Francisco Balagtas ay ang Koridong Florante at Laura. Ang korido na ito ay ginawa niyang obra maestra bilang salamin ng uri ng pamahalaan mayroon noon ang Pilipinas sa ilalim ng mga Kastila. Inialay niya ito sa kanyang nag-lisang babaing iniibig na si Maria Asuncion Rivera na tinawag niyang Selya. Ikalawa, ang Florante at Laura ay nagpapaalala ng mga apat na himagsik at pananaw ni Balagtas laban sa hindi makataong pamamahala ng pamahalaang Kastila sa mga Pilipino.

Verbs
Tagalog verbs are morphologically complex and are conjugated by taking on a variety of affixes reflecting focus/trigger, aspect, voice, and other categories. Below is a chart of the main verbal affixes, which consist of a variety of prefixes, suffixes, infixes, and circumfixes.

Conventions used in the chart:
 CV~ stands for the reduplicated first syllable of a root word, which is usually the first consonant and the first vowel of the word.
 N stands for a nasal consonant which assimilates to ng, n, or m depending on the consonant following it. ∅ means that the verb root is used, therefore no affixes are added.
The word sumulat (sulat) (actor focus and completed aspect or infinitive) is composed of the root word sulat and the infix . Its other conjugated forms are susulat (su~sulat) and sumusulat (su~sulat).

In old Tagalog, for actor trigger I, the affix "-ungm-" like "sungmulat and sungmusulat" is meant for complete and progressive,"-um-" used to be an infinitive form like "sumulat". When a verb starts in an "i", it becomes "-ingm-" like "tingmingin and tingmitingin" is meant for complete and progressive and "-im-" is meant for infinitive like "timingin, this is also known as "Vowel harmony"."Also, when a verb starts in a "B" or "P", it becomes a N for complete and progressive like "nasok and nanasok" and M for contemplative and infinitive like "mamasok and masok." However, they're lost in the Manila dialect but it is still preserved in the Tagalog dialects. But the allophones, D and R are still preserved when it comes to verbs like "dating (to arrive)" but is sometimes ignored.    

With the suffixes -in and -an, if the root word ends in a vowel, the suffixes insert an h at the beginning to become -hin and -han to make speaking more natural. This does not usually happen with root words ending in pseudo-vowels such as w and y. An example of this is basa which becomes basahin rather than basain.

The imperative affixes are not often used in Manila, but they do exist in other Tagalog speaking provinces.

Aspect
The aspect of the verb indicates the progressiveness of the verb. It specifies whether the action happened, is happening, or will happen. Tagalog verbs are conjugated for time using aspect rather than tense.

Infinitive (Pawatas) 
This is the combination of the root word and an affix. This is the basis for most verbs.

Complete (Naganap/Perpektibo) 
This states that the action has been completed.

An infinitive with the affix um and a complete aspect are the same.

An infinitive with the affixes ma, mag and mang will become na, nag and nang in the complete aspect.

The affix in in an infinitive will be a prefix if the root word begins with a vowel and an infix if the root word begins with a consonant. If the affix is hin, then hin will become in.

Progressive (Nagaganap/Imperpektibo) 
This states that the action is still ongoing and still not done.

If the infinitive has the affix um, the first syllable or the first two letters of the root word will be repeated. Note that in certain contexts, the infinitive form can also mean that the action has been completed(Naganap).

If the infinitive has the affixes ma, mag and mang, change it to na, nag and nang and repeat the first syllable or first two letters of the root word.

If the infinitive has the affixes in or hin and the root word starts with a vowel, put the affix at the start and repeat the first syllable or first two letters of the root word.

If the infinitive has the affixes in or hin and the root word starts with a consonant, make the affix into an infix and repeat the first syllable or first two letters of the root word.

Contemplative (Magaganap/Kontemplatibo)  
This states that the action has not yet started but anticipated.

If the infinitive has the affix um, remove the um and repeat the first syllable or first two letters of the root word.

If the infinitive has the affixes ma, mag and mang, retain it and repeat the first syllable or first two letters of the root word.

If the infinitive has the affixes in or hin, retain it and repeat the first syllable or first two letters of the root word.

Recently Complete (Katatapos) 
This states that the action has just been completed before the time of speaking or before a specified time.

Usually, the prefix ka is used and the first syllable or the first two letters of the root word will be repeated.

Trigger
The central feature of verbs in Tagalog and other Philippine languages is the trigger system, often called voice or focus. In this system, the thematic relation (agent, patient, or other oblique relationslocation, direction, etc.) of the noun marked by the direct-case particle is encoded in the verb.

In its default unmarked form, the verb triggers a reading of the direct noun as the patient of the clause. In its second most common form, it triggers the noun as the agent of the clause. Other triggers are location, beneficiary, instrument, reason, direction, and the reciprocal.

Patient trigger forms 
There are three main patient-trigger affixes:
 -in is used for:
 Items that are moved towards the actor: kainin (to eat something), bilhín (to buy something).
 Items that are permanently changed: basagin (to crack something), patayín (to kill something).
 Items that are thought of: isipin (to think of something), alalahanin (to remember something).
 i- is used for items which undergo a change of state such as being moved away from an actor: ibigáy (to give something), ilagáy (to put something), itaním (to plant something).
 -an is used for items undergoing a surface change (e.g., cleaning): hugasan (to rinse something), walisán (to sweep something off).

Affixes can also be used in nouns or adjectives: baligtaran (from baligtád, to reverse) (reversible), katamaran (from tamád, lazy) (laziness), kasabihán (from sabi, to say) (proverb), kasagutan (from sagót, answer), bayarín (from bayad, to pay) (payment), bukirín (from bukid, farm), lupaín (from lupa, land), pagkakaroón (from doón/roón, there) (having/appearance), and pagdárasál (from dasál, prayer). Verbs with affixes (mostly suffixes) are also used as nouns, which are differentiated by stress position. Examples are panoorin (to watch or view) and panoorín (materials to be watched or viewed), hangarín (to wish) and hangarin (goal/objective), aralin (to study) and aralín (studies), and bayaran (to pay) and bayarán (someone or something for hire).

Agent trigger forms 
The agent-trigger affixes are -um-, mag-, man-, and ma-. The difference between mag- and -um- is a source of confusion among learners of the language. Generally speaking, there are two main distinctions among many; mag- refers to externally directed actions and -um- for internally directed actions. For example, bumilí means to buy while magbilí means to sell. However this isn't writ law for these affixes; there are exceptions for example, mag-ahit means to shave oneself while umahit means to shave someone. magbili and umahit are rarely used; in southern dialects of Tagalog na- is used instead of -um-.

ma- is used with only a few roots which are semantically intransitive, for example, matulog (to sleep). Ma- is not to be confused with ma-, the prefix for patient-triggered verb forms.

List of triggers and examples 
The patient trigger takes the direct noun as the patient (object) of the action:
Binilí ng lalaki ang saging sa tindahan para sa unggóy.
The man bought the banana at the store for the monkey.
The agent trigger marks the direct noun as the agent:
Bumilí ng saging ang lalaki sa tindahan para sa unggóy.
The man bought bananas at the store for the monkey.
The locative trigger refers to the location or direction of an action or the area affected by the action.
Binilhan ng lalaki ng saging ang tindahan.
The man bought bananas at the store.

The benefactive trigger refers to the person or thing that benefits from the action; i.e., the beneficiary of an action.
Ibinilí ng lalaki ng saging ang unggóy.
The man bought bananas for the monkey.The instrumental trigger refers to the means by which an action is performed.Ipinambilí ng lalaki ng saging ang pera ng asawa niyá.The man bought bananas with his spouse's money.The reason trigger refers to the cause or reason why an action is performed.

 Ikinagulat ng lalaki ang pagdatíng ng unggóy.The man got surprised because of the monkey's arrival.The directional trigger refers to the direction the action will go to.Pinuntahan ng lalaki ang tindahan.The man went to the store.The reciprocal trigger refers to the action being done by the subjects at the same time. The subject is usually compound, plural or collective.Naghalikan ang magkasintahan.The couple kissed (each other).Mood
Tagalog verbs also have affixes expressing grammatical mood; some examples are indicative, potential, social, causative and distributed.

Indicative
Nagdalá siyá ng liham.
"(S)he brought a letter."

Bumilí kamí ng bigás sa palengke.
"We bought rice in the market."

Kumain akó.
"I ate."

Hindî siyá nagsásalitâ ng Tagalog.
"(S)he does not speak Tagalog."

Causative 
Nagpadalá siya ng liham sa kaniyáng iná.
"He sent (literally: caused to be brought) a letter to his mother."

Distributive
Namili kamí sa palengke.
"We went shopping in the market."

Social
Nakikain akó sa mga kaibigan ko.
"I ate with my friends."

Potential maka-Hindî siyá nakapagsásalitâ ng Tagalog.
"(S)he was not able to speak Tagalog."

Nouns
While Tagalog nouns are not inflected, they are usually preceded by case-marking particles. These follow an Austronesian alignment, also known as a trigger system, which is a distinct feature of Austronesian languages. There are three basic cases: direct (or absolutive, often less accurately labeled the nominative); indirect (which may function as an ergative, accusative, or genitive); and oblique.

The direct case is used for intransitive clauses. In transitive clauses using the default grammatical voice of Tagalog, the direct marks the patient (direct object) and the indirect marks the agent, corresponding to the subject in English. In the more marked voice the reverse occurs, with the direct marking the agent and the indirect marking the patient. Because the base form of the clause is superficially similar to the passive voice in English, this has led to a misconception that Tagalog is spoken primarily in the passive voice. It is also superficially similar to ergative languages such as those of Australia, so Tagalog has also been analyzed as an ergative language. However, the English passive clause is intransitive, and likewise in ergative languages one of the voices forms an intransitive clause, whereas in Tagalog both voices are transitive, and so align well with neither nominative–accusative languages such as English nor with ergative languages.

One of the functions of voice in Tagalog is to code definiteness, analogous to the use of definite and indefinite articles in English. When the patient is marked with the direct case particle, it is generally definite, whereas when it is marked with the indirect case it is generally indefinite.

The oblique particle and the locative derived from it are similar to prepositions in English, marking things such as location and direction.

The case particles fall into two classes: one used with names of people (proper) and one for everything else (common).

The common indirect marker is spelled ng and pronounced . Mgá, pronounced , marks the common plural.

Tagalog has associative plural in addition to additive plural.

Cases

Common noun affixes

Examples

Note that in Tagalog, even proper nouns require a case marker.

Pronouns
Like nouns, personal pronouns are categorized by case. As above, the indirect forms also function as the genitive.

Pronoun sequences are ko ikaw (kita), ko kayo, ko siya, and ko sila.Examples:Sumulat ako."I wrote."Sinulatan ako ng liham."He/She/They wrote me a letter."
Note: If "ng liham" is removed from the sentence, it becomes "I was written on"Ibíbigay ko sa kaniyá."I will give it to him/her/them."

Genitive pronouns follow the word they modify. Oblique pronouns can take the place of the genitive pronoun but they precede the word they modify.Ang bahay ko.Ang aking bahay."My house."

The inclusive dual pronoun kata/kitá has largely disappeared from the Manila Dialect. It survives in other Tagalog dialects, particularly those spoken in the rural areas. However kitá is used to replace the pronoun sequence [verb] ko ikaw, (I [verb] you).

The 1st–2nd dual pronoun "kata/kitá" referring to "you and I" is traditionally used as follows:Mágkaibigan kitá. (Manila Dialect: Mágkaibigan tayo.)
"You and I are friends." (Manila Dialect: “We are friends.")

Examples: Mágkásintahan kitá.(We are lovers.)Maayós áng bahay nita. (Our house is fixed.) Magagandá áng mgá paróroonan sá kanitá. (The destinations are beautiful at ours.) 

As previously mentioned, the pronoun sequence [verb] ko ikáw, (I [verb] you) may be replaced by kitá.Mahál kitá."I love you."Bíbigyan kitá ng pera."I will give you money."Nakita kitá sa tindahan kahapon."I saw you at the store yesterday."Kaibigan kitá."You are my friend."

The inclusive pronoun tayo refers to the first and second persons. It may also refer to a third person(s).

The exclusive pronoun kamí refers to the first and third persons but excludes the second.Walâ tayong bigás."We (you and me) have no rice."Walâ kaming bigás."We (someone else and me, but not you) have no rice."

The second person singular has two forms. Ikáw is the non-enclitic form while ka is the enclitic which never begins a sentence. The plural form kayó is also used politely in the singular, similar to French vous.

Nouns are gender neutral, hence siyá means he, she, or they (singular).

Polite or formal usage
Tagalog, like many languages, marks the T–V distinction: when addressing a single person in polite/formal/respectful settings, pronouns from either the 2nd person plural or the 3rd person plural group are used instead of the singular 2nd person pronoun. They can be used with, or in lieu of, the pô/hô iterations without losing any degree of politeness, formality, or respect:ikáw or ka ("you" sgl.) becomes kayó ("you" pl.) or silá ("they")mo (post-substantive "your") becomes niyó or ninyó (more polite), (post-substantive "your" pl.) or nilá (post-substantive "their")iyó(ng) ("yours" sgl. or pre-substantive "your" sgl.) becomes inyó(ng) ("yours" pl. or pre-substantive "your" pl.) or kanilá(ng) ("theirs" or pre-substantive "their")

Example:
English: "What's your name?"
Casual: Anó'ng pangalan mo?Respectful: Anó'ng pangalan ninyo? or Anó'ng pangalan nilá?

Using such pluralized pronouns is quite sufficient for expressing politeness, formality or respect, particularly when an affirmative (or negative) pô/hô iteration isn't necessary.

Demonstrative pronouns
Tagalog's demonstrative pronouns are as follows.

Notes:

- Although dine and dito  both mean here, it's difference is the first one pertains to the speaker only while the second one includes the listener. Lost in Standard Filipino/Tagalog (Manila dialect: dito) but still survive in province dialects like Batangas. The same goes for direct, indirect, oblique, locative, existential, and manner (nearest to speaker).

- Yaon is an old-fashioned word which means that.The 
modern word is iyon. 

- The oblique are verbs and locative are pseudo-verbs; for instance, dumito, dumidito, and didito for oblique; and narito, naririto, and nandito for oblique. However, some are archaic and some are old-fashioned. 

- Words like parine, parito, pariyan, and paroon are combined with pa+(oblique word). These were old-fashioned and/or archaic but still survive in dialects.

- The contractions are: 're, 'to, 'yan, 'yun, n'yan, gan'to, gan'yan, gan're, gano'n (gayon)

*Many Tagalog speakers may use itó in place of iré/aré.

Examples:

Anó itó?
"What's this?"

Sino ang lalaking iyon?
"Who is that man?"

Galing kay Pedro ang liham na itó.
"This letter is from Pedro."

Nandito akó.
"I am here."

Kakain silá roón.
"They will eat there."

Saán ka man naróroon.
"Wherever you are."

Kumain niyán ang batà.
"The child ate some of that."

Ayón palá ang salamín mo!
"So that's where your glasses are!"

Heto isang regalo para sa iyó.
"Here's a gift for you."

 Adjectives 
Just like English adjectives, Tagalog adjectives modify a noun or a pronoun.

 Forms 

 Simple (Payak) 
These consist of only the root word.

Examples: hinog (ripe), sabog (exploded), ganda (beautiful)

 Affixed (Maylapi) 
These consist of the root word and one or more affixes.

Examples: tinanong (questioned), kumakain (eating), nagmamahal (loving)

 Repeating (Inuulit) 
These are formed by the repetition of the whole or part of the root word.

Examples: pulang-pula (really red), puting-puti (really white), araw-araw (every day), gabi-gabi (every night)

 Compound (Tambalan) 
These are compound words.

Examples: ngiting-aso (literally: "dog smile", meaning: "big smile"), balat-sibuyas (literally: "onion-skinned", meaning: "crybaby")

 Types 

 Descriptive (Panlarawan) 
This states the size, color, form, smell, sound, texture, taste, and shape.

Examples: munti (little), biluhaba (oval), matamis (sweet), malubha (serious)

 Proper (Pantangi) 
This states a specific noun. This consists of a common noun and a proper noun. The proper noun (that starts with a capital letter) is modifying the type of common noun.

Examples: wikang Ingles (English language), kulturang Espanyol (Spanish culture), pagkaing Iloko (Ilokano food)

 Pamilang 
This states the number, how many, or a position in order. This has multiple types.

 Sequence (Panunuran) – This states the position in an order. Examples: ikatlo (third), una (first), pangalawa (second)
 Quantitative (Patakaran) – This states the actual number. Examples: isa (one), apat (four), limang libo (five thousand)
 Fraction (Pamahagi) – This states a part of a whole. Examples: kalahati (half), limang-kawalo (five-eights), sangkapat (fourth)
 Monetary (Pahalaga) – This states a price (equivalent to money) of a thing or any bought item. Examples: piso (one peso), limampung sentimo (fifty centavoes), sandaang piso (one hundred pesos)
 Collective (Palansak) – This states a group of people or things. This identifies the number that forms that group. Examples: dalawahan (by two), sampu-sampu (by ten), animan (by six)
 Patakda – This states the exact and actual number. This cannot be added or subtracted. Examples: iisa (only one), dadalawa (only two), lilima (only five)

 Degrees of Comparison 
Just like English adjectives, Tagalog adjectives have 3 degrees of comparison.

 Positive (Lantay) 
This only compares one noun/pronoun.

Example: maliit (small), kupas (peeled), mataba (fat)

 Comparative (Pahambing) 
This is used when 2 nouns/pronouns are being compared. This has multiple types.

 Similar (Magkatulad) – This is the comparison when the traits compared are fair. Usually, the prefixes ga-, sing-/kasing-, and magsing-/magkasing- are used.
 Dissimilar (Di-magkatulad) – This is the comparison if it shows the idea of disallowance, rejection or opposition.
 Palamang – the thing that is being compared has a positive trait. The words "higit", "lalo", "mas", "di-hamak" and others are used.
 Pasahol – the thing that is being compared has a negative trait. The words "di-gaano", "di-gasino", "di-masyado" and others are used.

 Superlative (Pasukdol) 
This is the highest degree of comparison. This can be positive or negative. The prefix "pinaka" and the words "sobra", "ubod", "tunay", "talaga", "saksakan", and "hari ng ___" are used, as well as the repetition of the adjective.

 Degrees of Description 
These degrees have no comparison.

 Lantay 
This is when the simple/plain form of the adjective is being used for description.

Examples: matalino (smart), palatawa (risible)

 Katamtaman 
This is when the adjective is accompanied by the words "medyo", "nang kaunti", "nang bahagya" or the repetition of the root word or the first two syllables of the root word.

Examples: medyo mataba (somewhat fat), malakas nang bahagya (slightly strong), malakas-lakas (somewhat strong), matabang nang kaunti (a little bit insipid)

 Masidhi 
This is when the adjective is accompanied by the words "napaka", "ubod ng", "saksakan ng", "talagang", "sobrang", "masyadong" or the repetition of the whole adjective. The description in this degree is intense.

Examples: napakalakas (so strong), ubod ng bait (really kind), talagang mabango (truly fragrant), sobrang makinis (oversmooth)

 Number 
There are rules that are followed when forming adjectives that use the prefix "ma-".

 Singular (Isahan) 
When the adjective is describing only one noun/pronoun, "ma-" and the root word is used.

Examples: masaya (happy), malungkot (sad)

 Plural (Maramihan) 
When the adjective is describing two or more noun/pronoun, "ma-" is used and the first syllable or first two letters of the root word is repeated.

Examples: maliliit (small), magaganda (beautiful)

The word "mga" is not needed if the noun/pronoun is right next to the adjective.

Example: Ang magagandang damit ay kasya kina Erica at Bel. (The beautiful clothes can fit to Erica and Bel.)

 Ligature 
The Ligature (pang-angkop) connects/links modifiers (like adjectives and adverbs) and the words that they are modifying. It has two allomorphs:naThis is used if the preceding word is ending on a consonant except n. It is not combined with the preceding word but separated, appearing between the modifier and the word it modifies.

Example:  ('loving person')-ngThis suffixed allomorph is used if the preceding word is ending on a vowel or n; in the latter case, the final n is lost and replaced by the suffix:

Examples:  ('good creation of God');  (< ) ('ideal citizen')

Conjunctions

Tagalog uses numerous conjunctions, and may belong to one of these possible functions:

 separate non-contrasting ideas (e.g. at "and")
 separate contrasting ideas (e.g. ngunit "but")
 give explanations (e.g. kung "if")
 provide circumstances (e.g. kapag "when")
 indicate similarities (e.g. kung saan "where")
 provide reasons (e.g dahil "because")
 indicate endings (e.g. upang "[in order] to")

Modifiers
Modifiers alter, qualify, clarify, or limit other elements in a sentence structure. They are optional grammatical elements but they change the meaning of the element they are modifying in particular ways. Examples of modifiers are adjectives (modifies nouns), adjectival clauses, adverbs (modifies verbs), and adverbial clauses. Nouns can also modify other nouns. In Tagalog, word categories are fluid: A word can sometimes be an adverb or an adjective depending on the word it modifies. If the word being modified is a noun, then the modifier is an adjective, if the word being modified is a verb, then it is an adverb. For example, the word 'mabilis' means 'fast' in English. The Tagalog word 'mabilis' can be used to describe nouns like 'koneho' ('rabbit') in 'konehong mabilis' ('quick rabbit'). In that phrase, 'mabilis was used as an adjective. The same word can be used to describe verbs, one can say 'tumakbong mabilis' which means 'quickly ran'. In that phrase, 'mabilis' was used as an adverb. The Tagalog word for 'rabbit' is 'koneho' and 'ran' is 'tumakbo' but they showed up in the phrases as 'koneho-ng' and 'tumakbo-ng'. Tagalog uses something called a "linker" that always surfaces in the context of modification. Modification only occurs when a linker is present. Tagalog has the linkers -ng and na. In the examples mentioned, the linker -ng was used because the word before the linker ends in a vowel. The second linker, na is used everywhere else (the na used in modification is not the same as the adverb na which means 'now' or 'already'). Seeing the enclitics -ng and na are good indications that there is modification in the clause. These linkers can appear before or after the modifier.

The following table summarizes the distribution of the linker: 

Sequence of modifiers in a noun phrase
The following tables show a possible word order of a noun phrase containing a modifier. Since word order is flexible in Tagalog, there are other possible ways in which one could say these phrases. To read more on Tagalog word order, head to the Word Order section.

Enclitic particles
Tagalog has enclitic particles that have important information conveying different nuances in meaning. Below is a list of Tagalog's enclitic particles.

na and pa
na: now, already
pa: still, else, in addition, yet
man, kahit: even, even if, even though
bagamán: although
ngâ: indeed; used to affirm or to emphasise. Also softens imperatives.
din (after a vowel: rin): too, also
lamang (contracted as lang): limiting particle; only or just
daw (after a vowel: raw): a reporting particle that indicates the preceding information as secondhand; they say, he said, reportedly, supposedly, etc.
pô (less respectful form: hô): marker indicating politeness.
ba: used to end yes-and-no questions and optionally in other types of questions, similar to Japanese -ka and Chinese ma (嗎), but not entirely.
muna: for now, for a minute, and yet (when answering in the negative).
namán: used in making contrasts; softens requests; emphasis
kasí: expresses cause; because
kayâ: expresses wonder; I wonder; perhaps (we should do something); also optionally used in yes-and-no questions and other forms of questions
palá: expresses that the speaker has realized or suddenly remembered something; realization particle; apparently
yatà: expresses uncertainty; probably, perhaps, seems
tulóy: used in cause and effect; as a result
sana: expresses hope, unrealized condition (with the verb in completed aspect), used in conditional sentences.

The order listed above is the order in which the particles follow if they are used in conjunction with each other. A more concise list of the orders of monosyllabic particles from Rubino (2002) is given below.
na / pa
ngâ
din ~ rin
daw ~ raw
pô / hô
ba

The particles na and pa cannot be used in conjunction with each other as well as pô and hô.

Dumatíng na raw palá ang lola mo.
"Oh yes, your grandmother has apparently arrived."

Palitán mo na rin.
"Do change it as well."

Note for "daw/raw and rin/din": If the preceding letter is a consonant except y and w, the letter d is used in any word, vice versa for r e.g., pagdárasal, instead of pagdádasal

Although in everyday speech, this rule is often ignored.

Walâ pa yatang asawa ang kapatíd niyá.
"Perhaps his brother still hasn’t a wife."

Itó lang kayâ ang ibibigáy nilá sa amin?
"I wonder, is the only thing that they'll be giving us?"

Nag-aral ka na ba ng wikang Kastilà?
"Have you already studied the Spanish language?"

Batà pa kasí.
"He's still young, is why."

Pakisulat mo ngâ muna ang iyóng pangalan dito.
"Please, do write your name here first."

The words daw and raw, which mean “he said”/“she said”/“they said”, are sometimes joined to the real translations of “he said”/”she said”, which is sabi niyá, and “they said”, which is sabi nilá. They are also joined to the Tagalog of “you said”, which is sabi mo. But this time, both daw and raw mean “supposedly/reportedly”.

Sabi raw niyá. / Sabi daw niyá.
"He/she supposedly said."

Sabi raw nilá. / Sabi daw nilá.
"They supposedly said."

Sabi mo raw. / Sabi mo daw.
"You supposedly said."

Although the word kasí is a native Tagalog word for “because” and not slang, it is still not used in formal writing. The Tagalog word for this is sapagká’t or sapagkát. Thus, the formal form of Batà pa kasí is Sapagká’t batà pa or Sapagkát batà pa. This is sometimes shortened to pagká’t or pagkát, so Sapagká’t batà pa is also written as Pagká’t batà pa or Pagkát batà pa. In both formal and everyday writing and speech, dahil sa (the oblique form of kasí; thus, its exact translation is “because of”) is also synonymous to sapagká’t (sapagkát), so the substitute of Sapagká’t batà pa for Batà pa kasí is Dahil sa batà pa. Most of the time in speech and writing (mostly every day and sometimes formal), dahil sa as the Tagalog of “because” is reduced to dahil, so Dahil sa batà pa is spoken simply as Dahil batà pa.

Word order

Tagalog has a flexible word order compared to English. While the verb always remains in the initial position, the order of noun phrase complements that follows is flexible. An example provided by Schacter and Otanes can be seen in (1).

The flexibility of Tagalog word order can be seen in (2). There are six different ways of saying 'The man gave the woman a book.' in Tagalog. The following five sentences, along with the sentence from (1), include the same grammatical components and are all grammatical and identical in meaning but have different orders.

The principles in (3) help to determine the ordering of possible noun phrase complements. In a basic clause where the patient takes the nominative case, principles (i) and (ii) requires the actor to precede the patient. In example (4a), the patient, 'liham (letter) takes the nominative case and satisfies principles (i) and (ii). The example in (4b) shows that the opposite ordering of the agent and patient does not result in an ungrammatical sentence but rather an unnatural one in Tagalog.

In example (5), the verb, 'binihag', (captivated) is marked for active voice and results in the actor ('Kuya Louis') to take the nominative case. Example (5) doesn't satisfy principles (i) and (ii). That is, principle (i) requires the Actor ('Kuya Louis') to precede all other arguments. However, since the Actor also takes the nominative case, principle (ii) requires the phrase 'Kuya Louis''' to come last. The preferred order of agent and patient in Tagalog active clauses is still being debated. Therefore, we can assume that there are two "unmarked" word orders: VSO or VOS.

A change in word order and trigger generally corresponds to a change in definiteness ("the" vs "a") in English. Example (6) shows a change in word order, triggered by the indirect, "ng." Example (7) shows a change in word order, triggered by the direct, "ang."Word order may be inverted (referred to in Tagalog grammar as Kabalikang Anyo) by way of the inversion marker 'ay ' ( ’y after vowels in informal speech, not usually used in writing). Contrary to popular belief, this is not the copula 'to be' as 'ay' does not behave as an existential marker in an SVO structure and an inverted form VSO does not require 'ay since the existentiality is denoted by case marking. A slight, but optional, pause in speech or a comma in writing may replace the inversion marker. This construction is often viewed by native speakers as formal or literary.

In this construction (ay-inversion), the 'ay appears between the fronted constituent and the remainder of the clause. The fronted constituent in the construction includes locations and adverbs. Example (8)- (11) shows the inverted form of the sentences in the previous examples above.

In (8) and (11), the fronted constituent is the subject. On the other hand, in (9), the fronted constituent is the object. Another example of a fronted constituent in Tagalog is, wh-phrases. Wh-phrases include interrogative questions that begin with: who, what, where, when, why, and how. In Tagalog, wh-phrases occur to the left of the clause. For example, in the sentence, 'Who are you?', which translates to, 'Sino ka? occurs to the left of the clause. The syntactic tree of this sentence is found in (12a). As we can see in (12a), the complementizer position is null. However, in the case where an overt complementizer is present, Sabbagh (2014) proposes that the wh-phrase lowers from Spec, CP, and adjoins to TP when C is overt (12b). The operation in (12b) is known as, WhP lowering.

This operation of lowering can also be applied in sentences to account for the verb-initial word order in Tagalog. The subject-lowering analysis states that "the subject lowers from Spec, TP and adjoins to a projection dominated by TP.". If we use the example from (2), Nagbigay ang lalaki ng libro sa babae. and applied subject lowering, we would see the syntax tree in (13a).If we lowered the subject, ang lalaki, to an intermediate position within VP, we would be able to achieve a VOS word order and still satisfy subject lowering. This can be seen in (13b).

Lowering is motivated by a prosodic constraint called, WeakStart. This constraint is largely based on the phonological hierarchy. This constraint requires the first phonological element within a phonological domain to be lower on the prosodic hierarchy than elements that follow it, within the same domain.

Negation
There are three negation words: hindî, walâ, and huwág.Hindî negates verbs and equations. It is sometimes contracted to ‘dî.

Hindî akó magtatrabaho bukas.
"I will not work tomorrow."

Hindî mayaman ang babae.
"The woman is not rich."Walâ is the opposite of may and mayroón ("there is").

Walâ akóng pera.
Akó ay walang pera.
"I do not have money."

Waláng libró sa loób ng bahay niyá.
"There are no books in his house."Huwág is used in expressing negative commands. It can be used for the infinitive and the future aspect. It is contracted as ‘wag.

Huwág kang umiyák.
"Do not cry."

Huwág kayóng tumakbó rito.
"Do not run here."

There are two (or more) special negative forms for common verbs:

Gustó/Ibig/Nais ko nang kumain.
"I would like to eat now." (Positive)

Ayaw ko pang kumain.
"I don't want to eat yet." (Negative)

Interrogative words
Tagalog's interrogative words are: alín, anó, bákit, gaáno, ilán, kailán, kaníno, kumustá, magkáno, nakaníno, nasaán, níno, paáno, saán, and síno. With the exceptions of bakit, kamustá, and nasaán, all of the interrogative words have optional plural forms which are formed by reduplication. They are used when the person who is asking the question anticipates a plural answer and can be called wh-phrases. The syntactic position of these types of phrases can be seen in (12a).Gaano (from ga- + anó) means how but is used in inquiring about the quality of an adjective or an adverb. The rootword of the modifier is prefixed with ga- in this construction (16a).Ilán means how many (16b). Kumustá is used to inquire how something is (are).(16c) It is frequently used as a greeting meaning How are you? It is derived from the Spanish ¿cómo está?. Magkano (from mag- + gaano) means how much and is usually used in inquiring the price of something (16d). Paano (from pa- + anó) is used in asking how something is done or happened (16e).Nino (from ni + anó) means who, whose, and whom (18a). It is the indirect and genitive form of sino. Sino (from si + anó) means who and whom and it is in the direct form (18b). Kanino''' (from kay + anó) means whom or whose (18c). It is the oblique form of sino (who).

See also
Abakada alphabet
Commission on the Filipino Language
Filipino alphabet
Filipino orthography
Tagalog phonology
Old Tagalog

Notes

 Bibliography 
 Kroeger, P. R. (1991). Phrase structure and grammatical relations in Tagalog
 Ramos, T. (1971). Tagalog Structures. Honolulu, HI: University of Hawaii Press. p. 126.
 Rubino, C. (2002). Tagalog-English, English-Tagalog dictionary / Taláhuluganang Pilipino-Ingglés, Ingglés-Pilipino Taláhuluganang. Conshohocken, PA: Hippocrene Books.
 Sabbagh, J. (2014). Word order and Prosodic‐Structure constraints in Tagalog. Syntax, 17(1), 40–89. 
 Sabbagh, J. (2011). Adjectival passives and the structure of VP in Tagalog. Lingua, 121, 1424–1452. 
 Scontras, G. & Nicolae A. (2014). Saturating syntax: Linkers and modification in Tagalog. Lingua, 149, 17–33. Baybayin: Paglalayag sa Wika at Panitikan 8 by Remedios Infantado  pp. 133–134, 169Bagong Likha: Wika at Pagbasa 4, by Ester V. Raflores , pp. 239, 252–253, 267–268, 283, 326–327, 341–342Pinagyamang Pluma 9, by Ailene G. Baisa-Julian, Mary Grace G. del Rosario, Nestor S. Lontoc , p. 86, 383
 mga-uri-ng-pang-uri.pdf. samutsamot.files.wordpress.com. Retrieved 19 June 2019.
 Baybayin: Paglalayag sa Wika at Panitikan 7'' by Ramilito Correa  p. 19

External links

 Tagalog grammar Free and comprehensive Tagalog grammar reference
 Interactive Language and Filipino Culture Resources Part of the SEAsite Project at Northern Illinois University, DeKalb, Illinois, USA

 
Austronesian grammars